James Barclay Harding (November 1, 1830 – October 29, 1865) was the publisher of the Philadelphia Evening Telegraph with Charles Edward Warburton.

Biography
He was born on November 1, 1830, to Jesper Harding and Maria Wilson. He died on October 29, 1865.

References

1830 births
1865 deaths
American newspaper publishers (people)
19th-century American journalists
American male journalists
19th-century American male writers
19th-century American businesspeople